The Valley of Wyoming is an 1865 painting by American painter Jasper Francis Cropsey. Cropsey, a prominent landscape painter, rendered Valley so as to depict the Wyoming Valley in Northeastern Pennsylvania. The painting was commissioned by Milton Courtright, who was born in the valley, for $3,500. The work is in the collection of the Metropolitan Museum of Art.

References 

1865 paintings
American paintings
Paintings in the collection of the Metropolitan Museum of Art